For the 1991 Vuelta a España, the field consisted of 198 riders; 116 finished the race.

By rider

By nationality

References

 Cyclists
1991